North Adelaide is a suburb in South Australia.

North Adelaide may also refer to the following places and organisations in South Australia.

Electoral district of North Adelaide, a former electorate
North Adelaide Fire Station, a former fire station
North Adelaide Football Club, an Australian Rules football club
North Adelaide Grammar School, a former school
North Adelaide Lacrosse Club, a lacrosse club
North Adelaide railway station, a former railway station

See also
Adelaide (disambiguation)
North Adelaide District Football Association
North Adelaide Football Club (disambiguation)